Blăgești is a commune in Bacău County, Western Moldavia, Romania. It is composed of five villages: Blăgești, Buda, Poiana Negustorului, Țârdenii Mari and Valea lui Ion.

References

Communes in Bacău County
Localities in Western Moldavia